Whitehorse Hill is a hill in the Berkshire Downs in Oxfordshire, England, west of Wantage.  At , it is the highest point in Oxfordshire.  Uffington Castle lies on the summit of the hill, and the Uffington White Horse is on the hill's northern slope.  The hill and an adjacent area below, including Dragon Hill and The Manger, make up a  biological and geological Site of Special Scientific Interest.

The Manger, a dry valley below the hill, is a Geological Conservation Review site. It provides evidence of solifluction (slow slipping of soil downhill due to repeated freezing and thawing) during at least one cold stage of the Pleistocene.

The site has unimproved chalk grassland with a rich variety of flora, particularly in former chalk quarries. Grasses include upright brome and sheep’s fescue.

The Ridgeway National Trail crosses the hill south of Uffington Castle.

See also
 Vale of White Horse

References

Hills of Oxfordshire
Sites of Special Scientific Interest in Oxfordshire
Geological Conservation Review sites
Vale of White Horse